Stadionul Tudor Vladimirescu was a multi-purpose stadium in Târgu Jiu, Romania.  It was mostly used for football matches and was the home ground of Pandurii Târgu Jiu. It was named after Wallachian hero Tudor Vladimirescu.

The stadium hosted the Romanian Cup Final of the 2008-2009 season.

The stadium was entirely demolished in 2015 and replaced by the new Stadionul Tudor Vladimirescu.

References

External links
Stadionul Tudor Vladimirescu
StadiumDB.com profile

See also
List of football stadiums in Romania

Football venues in Romania
Buildings and structures in Târgu Jiu
Multi-purpose stadiums in Romania
Buildings and structures in Gorj County
Defunct football venues in Romania
Demolished buildings and structures in Romania